The 1981 NFL draft was the procedure by which National Football League teams selected amateur college football players. It is officially known as the NFL Annual Player Selection Meeting. The draft was held April 28–29, 1981, at the New York Sheraton Hotel in New York City. The league also held a supplemental draft after the regular draft and before the regular season.

For the first time, the top two picks of the draft, running back George Rogers selected by the New Orleans Saints and linebacker Lawrence Taylor picked by the New York Giants, were named Offensive and Defensive Rookies of the Year, respectively.

Player selections

Round one

Round two

Round three

Round four

Round five

Round six

Round seven

Round eight

Round nine

Round ten

Round eleven

Round twelve

Hall of Famers
 Mike Singletary, linebacker from Baylor, taken 2nd round 38th overall by the Chicago Bears
Inducted: Professional Football Hall of Fame class of 1998.
 Lawrence Taylor, linebacker from North Carolina, taken 1st round 2nd overall by the New York Giants
Inducted: Professional Football Hall of Fame class of 1999.
 Ronnie Lott, cornerback from Southern California, taken 1st round 8th overall by the San Francisco 49ers
Inducted: Professional Football Hall of Fame class of 2000.
 Howie Long, defensive tackle from Villanova, taken 2nd round 48th overall by the Oakland Raiders
Inducted: Professional Football Hall of Fame class of 2000.
 Rickey Jackson, linebacker from Pittsburgh, taken 2nd round 51st overall by the New Orleans Saints
Inducted: Professional Football Hall of Fame class of 2010.
 Russ Grimm, offensive guard from Pittsburgh, taken 3rd round 69th overall by the Washington Redskins
Inducted: Professional Football Hall of Fame class of 2010.
 Kenny Easley, safety from UCLA, taken 1st round 4th overall by the Seattle Seahawks
Inducted: Professional Football Hall of Fame class of 2017.
 Sam Mills, linebacker from Montclair State, signed undrafted by the Cleveland Browns
Inducted: Professional Football Hall of Fame class of 2022 (posthumous).

Notable undrafted players

References

External links
 NFL.com – 1981 Draft
 databaseFootball.com – 1981 Draft
 Pro Football Hall of Fame
 VIDEO: 1981 NFL Draft (via YouTube): Part 1 – Part 2 – Part 3 – Part

National Football League Draft
NFL Draft
Draft
NFL Draft
NFL Draft
American football in New York City
1980s in Manhattan
Sporting events in New York City
Sports in Manhattan